CollegeConfidential.com (CC) is a college admissions website and online community founded in 2001. It hosts popular college admissions forums on topics such as admissions chances, financial aid, standardized testing, and school life.

History
College Confidential was founded to "demystify many aspects of the college admissions process, and to help even 'first timer' students and parents understand the process." The founding editorial team, consisting of Dave Berry, a senior admissions officer; David Hawsey; and Roger Dooley, a parent who is active in high school academics; supplied visitors with college admission content.

College Confidential Forums
The College Confidential Forum represents the most heavily used part of the site. It features a very active 'What Are My Chances?' subforum, where users are evaluated on their chances of acceptance to specific colleges based on their test scores, GPA, and extracurricular activities. There are also various other subforums regarding financial aid, SAT, ACT and AP test preparation, forums for all major colleges and universities, including those in the Ivy League, as well as for the nation's top research universities and liberal arts colleges.

Media coverage
College Confidential was covered in a New York Times front-page story on March 31, 2006. It has also been mentioned in a number of other press stories. The Harvard Crimson described its "chance me" discussions as full of incorrect information and internet trolls.

See also
List of Internet forums

References

External links

University and college admissions